Period. End of Sentence. is a 2018 documentary short film directed by Rayka Zehtabchi about Indian women leading a quiet sexual revolution.  The film stars Arunachalam Muruganantham, Shabana Khan, Gouri Choudari, Ajeya, and Anita. The documentary short follows a group of local women in Hapur, India, as they learn how to operate a machine that makes low-cost, biodegradable sanitary pads, which they sell to other women at affordable prices. This not only helps to improve feminine hygiene by providing access to basic products  but also supports and empowers the women to shed the taboos in India surrounding menstruation  all while contributing to the economic future of their community.  The film is inspired by the life of Arunachalam Muruganantham, a social activist from Coimbatore, India.

Plot 
Women are in charge of a tremendous change in a Kathikera village in the Hapur district which is 60 km away from Delhi, India. They battle the pervasive shame associated with menstruation. Their tale is presented in the documentary called "Period. End of Sentence", which was produced by Rayka Zehtabchi. The lack of access to pads among these women for centuries resulted in health issues, school absences, and eventual dropout of the girls. However, when a sanitary pad factory is set up in the hamlet, the women are taught how to produce and sell their own pads, which empowers the women there. They chose the brand name "FLY" for their company because they want women "to arise".

Source:

Reception

Critical response
Period.

Accolades
Winner of the Academy Award for Best Documentary (Short Subject)  91st Academy Awards
Winner of the Academy Award qualifying festivals for Best Short Doc at the Cleveland International Film Festival, the Traverse City Film Festival as well as many others including AFIFest, and Savannah.

References

Further reading

External linPad project

The Padproject 
Trailer

See also 

 Pad Man
 Phullu
 Shinaakht
 Culture and Menstruation
 Menstrual Hygiene Management
 Human Right to Water and Sanitation
 WASH (Water, Sanitation, and Hygiene)
Menstrual Suppression

2018 films
2018 short documentary films
American short documentary films
Best Documentary Short Subject Academy Award winners
Documentary films about women in India
Feminine hygiene
Films about sexuality
Films set in India
Kickstarter-funded documentaries
Netflix original documentary films
Menstrual cycle
2010s feminist films
2010s American films